Mark Krerowicz (born March 1, 1963) is a former American football guard. He played for the Cleveland Browns in 1987.

References

1963 births
Living people
American football offensive guards
Ohio State Buckeyes football players
Cleveland Browns players